West Park is a station on the RTA Red Line in Cleveland, Ohio. It is located off Lorain Avenue just west of West 143rd Street in the West Park neighborhood.

The station includes a large parking lot accessible from Lorain Avenue. The access road has been named Lloyd Peterson Lane. A station lobby building is located on the southeast side of the parking lot adjacent to the tracks. The station headhouse includes bus loading areas and also houses a training facility, which opened in 1983.
The headhouse is connected to the platforms by a tunnel extending underneath the westbound track.

History 

The CTS Rapid Transit was extended to West Park station on November 15, 1958, and the station functioned as the western terminus of the line for 10 years. There was a small rail yard just southwest of the station. When the line was extended to Cleveland Hopkins International Airport in 1968, the yard was removed and a new yard was built just beyond Brookpark station. The station building was connected to the platform by a tunnel extending under the westbound track.

In May 1996, RTA completed a $4-million renovation of the station. The renovation made the station ADA compliant.

Station layout

Notable places nearby 
 John Marshall High School

Gallery

References

External links 

Red Line (RTA Rapid Transit)
Railway stations in the United States opened in 1958
1958 establishments in Ohio
Former New York Central Railroad stations